is a former Japanese football player.

Club career stats
Updated to 22 December 2022.

References

External links

Profile at Vegalta Sendai

1986 births
Living people
Association football people from Tochigi Prefecture
Japanese footballers
J1 League players
J2 League players
Vegalta Sendai players
Association football midfielders